Eugene (1989) is an album by American saxophonist and composer Anthony Braxton with the Northwest Creative Orchestra recorded at the University of Oregon in 1989 for the Italian Black Saint label.

Reception
The AllMusic review by Scott Yanow awarded the album 3 stars calling it "A stimulating set of avant-garde music". The Penguin Guide to Jazz Recordings named the album as part of its suggested “core collection”.

Track listing
All compositions by Anthony Braxton.

 "Composition No. 112" – 10:03 
 "Composition No. 91" – 9:53 
 "Composition No. 134" – 10:49 
 "Composition No. 100" – 8:48 
 "Composition No. 93" – 8:26 
 "Composition No. 45" – 12:55 
 "Composition No. 71" – 10:32 
 "Composition No. 59" – 8:01
Recorded at Beall Hall at the University of Oregon in Eugene, Oregon on January 31, 1989

Personnel
Anthony Braxton – alto saxophone, conductor  
The Northwest Creative Orchestra:
Rob Blakeslee, John Jensen, Ernie Carbajal – trumpet
Ed Kammerer, Tom Hill, Mike Heffley – trombone
Thom Bergeron, Jeff Homan, Carl Woideck, Mike Curtis – reeds
Mike Vannice – reeds, piano
Todd Barton – synthesizer
Joe Robinson – guitar
Forrest Moyer – bass
Tom Kelly – percussion
Charles Dowd – percussion, vibraphone

References

Black Saint/Soul Note albums
Anthony Braxton live albums
1989 live albums